Paget Peak is a mountain in Yoho National Park, British Columbia, Canada. It is readily accessible via a hiking trail.

Description

It is in Yoho National Park, British Columbia, at the southern end of the Mount Daly Range, beside Mount Bosworth. 
It overlooks this lake and Sherbrooke Lake.
It is named after Dean Paget, the first to record ascending the peak, one of the founders of the Alpine Club of Canada (ACC).
He reached the summit with a group of ACC members.
The surveyor James J. McArthur ascended the peak in 1886.
The peak gives its name to Paget limestone, found at a type location on the southeast slope of the peak.

Access

The mountain may be accessed from the parking lot on the north side of the Trans-Canada Highway opposite Wapta Lake, just west of the Alberta border.
This is a hiking trail that leads to a disused fire lookout on the southern slope, one of the first to be built in the park. 
The lookout was built after two seasons of serious forest fires in the late 1930s and early 1940s, and was used until the late 1970s.
The trail is best used from June to September.
The peak may be reached by a scramble from the lookout.

Notes

Sources

Two-thousanders of British Columbia
Canadian Rockies
Kootenay Land District